Holy Family and Donors is a painting by the Italian Renaissance artist Vittore Carpaccio. It is collected in the Museu Calouste Gulbenkian, in Lisbon, Portugal.

The work shows the Holy Family on the left, and two donors in rich clothes on the right, all adoring the Christ Child in the centre. In the background is a fanciful landscape with the Magi riding towards the main scene.

References

1505 paintings
Paintings by Vittore Carpaccio
Nativity of Jesus in art
Horses in art
Paintings in the collection of the Calouste Gulbenkian Museum
Carpaccio